Female Trouble is a 1974 American independent dark comedy film co-composed, photographed, co-edited, written, produced, and directed by John Waters and starring Divine, David Lochary, Mary Vivian Pearce, Mink Stole, Edith Massey, Michael Potter, Cookie Mueller, and Susan Walsh. The film is about a delinquent high school student who runs away from home, gets pregnant while hitchhiking, and becomes entangled in a criminal scheme to prove "crime equals beauty".

The film is dedicated to Manson Family member Charles "Tex" Watson.

Plot
Spoiled delinquent high-school student Dawn Davenport goes berserk when her parents refuse to buy her the shoes she wants for Christmas because "nice girls don't wear cha-cha heels": she destroys presents, topples a Christmas tree on her mother, and flees the house. Dawn hitchhikes a ride with a lecherous man, Earl Peterson, who drives her to a dump where they have sex on a discarded mattress. Dawn gets pregnant, but Earl refuses to support her. She gives birth to a daughter, Taffy, whom she often beats and punishes severely. Dawn works various jobs and engages in criminal activities such as burglary and street prostitution with former high-school friends Chiclette and Concetta.

Dawn frequents the Lipstick Beauty Salon and marries Gater Nelson, her hair stylist and next-door neighbor. Donald and Donna Dasher, the owners of the beauty salon, recruit Dawn in a scheme to prove "crime and beauty are the same". They entice Dawn to commit crimes by promising her fame, supplying her with drugs and money, and photographing her crimes to stoke her vanity.

Gater's aunt, Ida Nelson, is distraught over her nephew's marriage because she wants him to date men instead of women. When the marriage fails, Dawn persuades the Dashers to fire Gater, who moves to Detroit to work in the auto industry.  Ida blames Dawn for driving Gater away and exacts revenge by throwing acid in her face, leaving Dawn hideously disfigured. The Dashers discourage Dawn from having corrective cosmetic surgery and use her as a grotesquely made-up model. After they kidnap Ida and imprison her in a large birdcage, they give Dawn an axe to chop off her hand as revenge for the acid attack.

Taffy, now a teenager, is distressed by her mother's criminal lifestyle and persuades her to reveal the identity of her father. Taffy finds her father drunk, disheveled and living in squalor. She stabs him to death with a chef's knife after he tries to sexually assault her. Taffy returns home, falsely claims she was unable to locate her father, and announces she is joining the Hare Krishna movement. Dawn warns her she will kill her if she does.

Dawn, now with bizarre hair, make-up and outfits provided by the Dashers, mounts a nightclub act. When Taffy appears backstage in religious attire, Dawn fulfills her threat and strangles her to death. Dawn brandishes a gun onstage during her nightclub act and begins firing into the crowd, wounding and killing several audience members. When police arrive to ostensibly subdue the crowd, they shoot several audience members themselves but allow the Dashers to leave when they claim to be upright citizens. Dawn flees into a forest, but is soon arrested by the police and put on trial for murder.

At the trial, the judge grants the Dashers immunity from prosecution for testifying against Dawn. The Dashers feign innocence and completely blame Dawn for the crimes she committed at their behest; they also pay Ida to lie on the witness stand. Although Dawn pleads not guilty by reason of insanity, the jury finds her guilty and sentences her to die in the electric chair. As a priest says a prayer and Dawn is strapped to the chair, she thanks her fans for her notoriety before being executed.

Cast

Theme song
The lyrics to the title song, sung by Divine, were written by Waters and set to the instrumental track of "Black Velvet Soul" by jazz musician Cookie Thomas. The lyrics foreshadow the ending of the film with Dawn being sent to the electric chair.

Production notes
 The unique production design is by Dreamlander Vincent Peranio, who created Dawn's apartment in a condemned suite above a friend's store. 
 Waters explained in a 2015 interview that Dawn Davenport's look was based on the woman in the famous 1966 Diane Arbus photograph  of a young Brooklyn family on a Sunday outing.
 Divine chose to perform his own stunts, the most difficult of which involved doing flips on a trampoline during his nightclub act. Waters took Divine to a YMCA, where he took lessons until the act was perfected to the point where he did the athletic stunt without his wig being dislodged. Divine also nailed a difficult outdoor stunt involving crossing a real river in drag in the sleet and rain. He could have been swept downstream, but made his mark on the other side with a smile on his face.
 The birth scene was saved until the end of shooting, when Dreamlander Susan Lowe gave birth to a son and agreed to Waters' request that they film her son as Dawn's baby. The umbilical cord was fashioned out of prophylactics filled with liver, while the baby (Ramsey McLean) was doused in fake blood. The scene greatly confused Lowe's mother-in-law, who was visiting from England to meet her grandchild for the first time.
 Although Dawn Davenport was executed at the end of the film, US capital punishment was suspended from 1972 to 1976 due to the Supreme Court's ruling in the case of Furman v. Georgia. Maryland did not formally reinstate capital punishment until July 1, 1975 (coincidentally, just 24 hours before John Waters had a "special sneak preview" of the film at a state prison where he did volunteer creative writing classes for inmates) and its constitutionality was not affirmed until 1976. Furthermore, asphyxiation in the gas chamber was the authorized method of execution, not electrocution. In the film, the jury pronounces Dawn's sentence, an act typically performed by a judge in actual court cases.
 On the 2004 DVD Director's Special Comments, Waters states that the original working title of the film was "Rotten Mind, Rotten Face". He changed it because he did not want to risk having hostile film critics using the headline “‘Rotten Mind, Rotten Face, Rotten Movie”–
 This film ended up being John Waters' last time he would work with actor David Lochary. Lochary was intended to act in Waters' next film Desperate Living, but he was on PCP at the time of production. He would die months after the movie was released.
 In the trial scene, the jury consisted of many of the main cast and crew's relatives. The easiest to point out were David Lochary's (Donald Dasher) mother (who was sitting on the top row to the far right) and brother (who is in the middle in the front row); and the mother of actor Ed Peranio (Wink) and set designer Vincent Peranio (who is spotted on the top row, third from the right).

Reception
The film has an 89% "Fresh" rating on review aggregator website Rotten Tomatoes based on 28 reviews, with an average rating of 7.1/10. The consensus summarizes: "Director John Waters' affection for camp brings texture to societal transgression in Female Trouble, a brazenly subversive dive into celebrity and mayhem."

Alternate versions
The initial 16mm release of the film which was shown at colleges ran 92 minutes. However, when the film was blown up to 35mm and shown theatrically, it was cut to 89 minutes. This version was the only version seen in the United States for many years. However, a recent restoration was done of the original cut, which runs 97 minutes; it has played at this 97-minute length in Europe, however, since its initial release.

The 97-minute version was shown only in select theaters and was included in an out-of-print DVD set paired with Pink Flamingos (Female Trouble is still available on DVD as a single disc and as part of a DVD box set, Very Crudely Yours, John Waters). This version also has a soundtrack remixed in stereo surround. The 97-minute version contains some additional scenes, including the chase through the woods, as well as an appearance by Sally Turner, the Elizabeth Taylor look-alike customer in the Lipstick Beauty Salon (Turner served as Divine's double in the junkyard sex scene between Dawn Davenport and Earl Peterson).

The film was shown in the 89-minute cut when re-released in 2002.

The 97-minute version is now available on DVD and includes an audio commentary by Waters.

The Criterion Collection released a restored version of the film in 4K on DVD and Blu-ray on June 26, 2018.

See also
 List of American films of 1974
 List of Christmas films

References

External links

 
 
 
 
 
 
 Female Trouble: Spare Me Your Morals an essay by Ed Halter at the Criterion Collection

1974 films
1970s black comedy films
1970s crime comedy films
1970s Christmas films
American black comedy films
American crime comedy films
American independent films
American LGBT-related films
Films directed by John Waters
Bisexuality-related films
Films about dysfunctional families
Films set in Baltimore
Films set in the 1960s
Films shot in Baltimore
Lesbian-related films
LGBT-related black comedy films
1974 LGBT-related films
1974 comedy films
1974 drama films
Drag (clothing)-related films
Filicide in fiction
1970s English-language films
1970s American films
1974 independent films